Fabien Engelmann (born on  in Algrange) is a French politician. He is the mayor of Hayange and regional councilor of Grand Est since 2015.

.

Biography 
Fabien Engelmann born on 7 May 1979. His father was an accountant. He's mayor of Hayange since 2014.

He was arrested for driving under the influence in Luxembourg in 2020 and is currently on trial.

References 

1979 births
Living people
Mayors of places in Grand Est
People from Moselle (department)